Ilya Alekseyevich Popov (born 19 June 2000) is a Russian amateur boxer who won gold medals at the 2018 Youth Olympics and 2018 European Youth Championships, and silver at the 2018 Youth World Championships, all in the light-welterweight division. In 2019 he joined the senior ranks and competed at the World Championships, losing in the quarter-finals to eventual gold medallist Andy Cruz of Cuba.

References

External links

Living people
2000 births
Russian male boxers
Light-welterweight boxers
Boxers at the 2018 Summer Youth Olympics
Youth Olympic gold medalists for Russia